Epimedium fargesii is a species of flowering plant in the family Berberidaceae, native to Sichuan and Hubei provinces of China. Its cultivar 'Pink Constellation' has gained the Royal Horticultural Society's Award of Garden Merit.

References

fargesii
Endemic flora of China
Flora of South-Central China
Plants described in 1894